Tatyana Alexandrovna Sudets    (first marriage —  Grushina, née —  Burantseva)    (born August 22, 1947 in Moscow) is a Soviet and Russian TV presenter and television announcer. She was recognised as a Merited Artist of the Russian Federation in 2000.

Biography 
Tatyana was born in Moscow, August 22, 1947. She graduated from the Moscow Power Engineering Institute.

In 1972 he came to the Soviet Central Television. Has been leading the program Vremya, Little Blue Light,   Skillful Hands, Pesnya goda, Good Night, Little Ones!.

In the years of perestroika went to Central Television switched to cable, led a variety of concerts.

Personal life 
 Her first husband —  Anatoly Grushin (1965-1972), Research Fellow
 Son —  Andrey (killed in 1992)
 Second husband (from 1978 to 1985) —  a military translator Vladimir, the son of Air Marshal Vladimir Sudets's; 
 Daughter —  Darya 
Grandson —  Kirill (2006)
Granddaughter —  Anna (2010)
 Third husband —  KGB colonel Mikhail Miroshnikov (1988 to 1995)

References

External links
 В роду Татьяны Судец погибали все мужчины
 Татьяна Судец: вечная  тётя Таня

1947 births
Living people
Soviet television presenters
Russian television presenters
Soviet actresses
Russian actresses
Honored Artists of the Russian Federation
Actresses from Moscow
Moscow Power Engineering Institute alumni
Russian women television presenters